Numba Mwila (18 March 1972 – 27 April 1993) was a Zambian footballer and member of the national team.  He was among those killed in the crash of the team plane in Gabon in 1993.

Career
Mwila played club football for Nkana F.C. in Zambia.

Personal
His two brothers Mukuka and Mumamba also played international football for Zambia.

References

External links

1972 births
1993 deaths
Zambian footballers
Zambia international footballers
Victims of aviation accidents or incidents in Gabon
Nkana F.C. players

Association footballers not categorized by position
Footballers killed in the 1993 Zambia national football team plane crash